Ralitsa is a village in Momchilgrad Municipality, Kardzhali Province, southern Bulgaria.

Honours
Ralitsa Glacier on Brabant Island, Antarctica is named after the village.

References

Villages in Kardzhali Province